Viyən (also, Viyan) is a village and municipality in the Lankaran Rayon of Azerbaijan.  It has a population of 2,603. 

The village's mosque dates from the 18th century, and is registered with the Ministry of Culture and Tourism.

References 

Populated places in Lankaran District